Lewis Corner or Lewis Corners may refer to:

Lewis Corner, Georgia, an unincorporated community
Lewis Corner, Maryland, an unincorporated community
Lewis Corners, New York, a hamlet in Oswego County, New York
Lewis Corners, New York, a hamlet in Oneida County, New York

See also
Louis Corners, Wisconsin